Archery at the 2013 Islamic Solidarity Games is held in Jakabaring Archery Range, Palembang, Indonesia from 24 September to 30 September 2013.

Medalists

Recurve

Compound

Medal table

References

Results

External links
2013 South Sumatera

2013 Islamic Solidarity Games
Islamic Solidarity Games
2013